System 3 Software Limited (known as System 3 Software Ltd. until 1991 and  Studio 3 Interactive Entertainment Ltd. from 1999 to 2003) is a British independent video game developer and publisher founded in 1982 by Mark Cale.

They created such games as The Last Ninja, Myth: History in the Making, International Karate, Putty, Constructor and its 1999 sequel Street Wars: Constructor Underworld (also known as Mob Rule) as well as dozens of other games.

Studio 3 was the internal development arm of System 3.

Games

Games developed

Games published

References

External links

System 3 Software Limited at MobyGames

Video game companies of the United Kingdom
Video game development companies
Video game companies established in 1982
British companies established in 1982